Tyrly is a rural locality (a khutor) in Kirovskoye Rural Settlement, Sredneakhtubinsky District, Volgograd Oblast, Russia. The population was 41 as of 2010. There are two streets.

Geography 
Tyrly is located 20 km northwest of Srednyaya Akhtuba (the district's administrative centre) by road. Tretya Karta is the nearest rural locality.

References 

Rural localities in Sredneakhtubinsky District